Rosa Elena Cornejo Pazmiño (11 December 1874 – 24 October 1964) was an Ecuadorian Roman Catholic nun who took the name of María Francisca of the Wounds after she became a nun. She established the Franciscan Missionaries of the Immaculata.

Pope Benedict XVI recognized her life of heroic virtue and conferred upon her the title of Venerable on 20 December 2012. A miracle attributed to her and needed for her beatification is now under investigation.

Life
Rosa Elena Cornejo Pazmiño was born on 11 December 1874 in Quito to Jose Cornejo. She received the sacrament of baptism moments after her birth.

Her mother raised her and provided for her education and her studies were later entrusted to nuns. She received the sacrament of Communion in 1884. Her mother died in 1893. She was one of several girls who were Franciscan tertiaries and shemade her profession on 5 June 1902. In 1913 the order she established - the Franciscan Missionaries of the Immaculata - was made aggregate to the Franciscan Order. She was made Superior General in 1936.

In 1950 she travelled to Rome for the canonization of Mariana de Jesús Paredes but also to seek the approval of Pope Pius XII for the institute. As a Franciscan pilgrim she travelled to Assisi. The order received full papal approval in a decree Pope John XXIII signed on 12 April 1962.

She died on 24 October 1964.

Beatification process
The beatification process started in Quito on 22 March 1986 which conferred upon her the title of Servant of God. The diocesan process spanned from 8 June 1986 to 13 December 1991; the process was ratified on 10 December 1993. The Positio was then submitted to the Congregation for the Causes of Saints in Rome in 2001 for evaluation.

Pope Benedict XVI approved that she lived a life of heroic virtue and declared her to be Venerable on 20 December 2012.

A miracle attributed to her intercession was investigated on a local level and was ratified on 13 November 1998. The medical board in Rome approved the miracle in 2013.

References

External links
Hagiography Circle
Saints SQPN

1874 births
1964 deaths
People from Quito
Venerated Catholics
19th-century venerated Christians
20th-century venerated Christians
Franciscans
Founders of Catholic religious communities